The 2007 Tour de l'Aude Cycliste Féminin was the 23rd edition of the Tour de l'Aude Cycliste Féminin, a women's cycling stage race in France. It was rated by the UCI as a category 2.2 race and was held between 18 and 27 May 2007.

Stages

Prologue
18 May 2007 – Gruissan to Gruissan, Individual time trial

Stage 1
19 May 2007 – Port-La-Nouvelle to Port-La-Nouvelle,

Stage 2
20 May 2007 – Argeles Sur Mer to Argeles Sur Mer, Team time trial

Stage 3
21 May 2007 – Lezignan Corbières to Lezignan Corbières,

Stage 4
22 May 2007 – Castelnaudary to Castelnaudary,

Stage 5
23 May 2007 – Osseja to Osseja,

Stage 6
24 May 2007 – Rieux-Minervois to Rieux-Minervois,

Stage 7
25 May 2007 – Rennes-les-Bains to Rennes-les-Bains,

Stage 8a
26 May 2007 – Quillan to Axat,

Stage 8b
26 May 2007 – Axat to Quillan,

Stage 9
27 May 2007 – Limoux to Limoux,

Final classification

Source

See also
 2007 in women's road cycling

References

External links
 

2007 in women's road cycling
2007
2007 in French sport
May 2007 sports events in France